"The Negotiation Limerick File" is a song by American hip-hop group the Beastie Boys, released as the third single from their fifth studio album Hello Nasty.

It peaked at #29 on the Billboard Modern Rock Tracks Chart.

The version on the CD single is 30 seconds longer (3:16) than the album version (2:46). It features extended instrumental sections with flanging effects. This song is unique because every verse is made up of five-line limericks.

Track listing
"The Negotiation Limerick File" – 3:16
"Three MCs and One DJ" (Live Video version) – 2:46
"Putting Shame in Your Game" (Prunes Remix) – 4:17
"The Negotiation Limerick File" (Handsome Boy Modeling School Makeover) – 4:33
"The Negotiation Limerick File" (The 41 Small Star Remix) – 3:24

Charts

References

1998 singles
Beastie Boys songs
Capitol Records singles
1997 songs
Songs written by Ad-Rock
Songs written by Mike D
Songs written by Adam Yauch
Songs written by Mario Caldato Jr.
Song recordings produced by Mario Caldato Jr.